County routes in Rockland County, New York, are maintained by the Rockland County highway department and signed with the Manual on Uniform Traffic Control Devices-standard yellow-on-blue pentagon route marker. Most of the routes act as primary roads in the less developed areas and also serve to interconnect the various villages and hamlets of the county. Across the county, routes are numbered such that odd-numbered routes are north–south and increase in number from east to west, while even-numbered routes are east–west and increase from south to north.

There are 63 current routes and seven routes no longer maintained by the county, making for a total of 70 routes. The longest routes are CR 33, CR 23, and CR 80, all at over ten miles (16 km). There are also two routes that cross into Orange County and keep the same number from Rockland: CR 106 in Tuxedo and CR 72 in Sloatsburg. Also, several routes enter from New Jersey; two of these include CR 41 in Chestnut Ridge and CR 89 in Airmont. The northernmost route is CR 118 in Stony Point and the southernmost is CR 4 in Palisades.


List of routes

See also

County routes in New York

Notes

References

External links

Rockland County Routes 1–25
Rockland County Routes 26–50
Rockland County Routes 51–75
Rockland County Routes 76–100
Rockland County Routes 101–118
Rockland County Maps